This is a list of heritage railroads in the United States.  There are currently no such railroads in the states of Mississippi or North Dakota.

Heritage railroads by state

Alabama
 Heart of Dixie Railroad Museum, Shelby & Southern Railroad and Calera & Shelby Railroad 
 North Alabama Railroad Museum, Mercury and Chase Railroad 
 Wales West Light Railway

Alaska
 Tanana Valley Railroad Museum in Pioneer Park (1899 engine)
 White Pass and Yukon Route

Arizona
 Arizona Railway Museum (No excursions listed)
 Arizona State Railroad Museum (In planning stages)
 Arizona Street Railway Museum (Phoenix Trolley Museum)
 Grand Canyon Railway
 McCormick-Stillman Railroad Park in Scottsdale
 Old Pueblo Trolley
 Verde Canyon Railroad

Arkansas
 Arkansas and Missouri Railroad
 Eureka Springs and North Arkansas Railway
 Fort Smith Trolley Museum
 Metro Streetcar

California 
 Angels Flight
 Billy Jones Wildcat Railroad, uses repurposed narrow gauge steam engines and is partly the inspiration for Walt Disney's theme park, Disneyland
 Calico and Odessa Railroad
 California State Railroad Museum
 California Western Railroad, also called The Skunk Train
 Disneyland Railroad (three locomotives are historic)
 Fillmore and Western Railway - short line used by Hollywood film industry. (Lease Agreement ended in 2021)
 Ghost Town & Calico Railroad in Knott's Berry Farm
 Golden Gate Railroad Museum (No excursions listed)
 Napa Valley Wine Train
 Nevada County Narrow Gauge Railroad & Transportation Museum
 Niles Canyon Railway
 Pacific Coast Railroad in Santa Margarita
 Pacific Southwest Railway Museum
 Placerville & Sacramento Valley Railroad, oldest railroad west of the Mississippi
 Port of LA Waterfront Red Car, a rebuilt part of the original Pacific Electric Railway system (Closed in 2015)
 Poway–Midland Railroad
 Sierra Railway - Railtown 1897 State Historic Park
 Red Car Trolley
 Redwood Valley Railway
 Roaring Camp & Big Trees Narrow Gauge Railroad
 Sacramento RiverTrain
 Sacramento Southern Railroad
 San Bernardino Railroad Historical Society (For AT&SF 3751 excursion trips)
 San Diego Trolley Silver Line
 San Francisco Municipal Railway
  E Embarcadero streetcar line
 F Market & Wharves streetcar line
 San Francisco cable car system
 San Jose Steam Railroad Museum (Proposed)
 San Luis Obispo Railroad Museum
 Santa Cruz, Big Trees and Pacific Railway
 Sierra Railroad
 Sonoma TrainTown Railroad
 Southern California Railway Museum (Formerly known as the Orange Empire Railway Museum from 1956-2018)
 Western Pacific Railroad Museum
 Western Railway Museum
 Yosemite Mountain Sugar Pine Railroad

Colorado
 Colorado Railroad Museum
 Como Roundhouse, Railroad Depot and Hotel Complex
 Cripple Creek and Victor Narrow Gauge Railroad
 Cumbres and Toltec Scenic Railroad
 Durango and Silverton Narrow Gauge Railroad
 Fort Collins trolley
 Georgetown Loop Railroad
 Leadville, Colorado and Southern Railroad 
 Manitou and Pikes Peak Railway
 Pikes Peak Historical Street Railway Foundation
 Platte Valley Trolley
 Rio Grande Scenic Railroad (Currently in receivership)
 Royal Gorge Route Railroad
 Ski Train
 Tiny Town Railroad

Connecticut
 Connecticut Trolley Museum
 Danbury Railway Museum
 Essex Steam Train operated by the Valley Railroad Company 
 Naugatuck Railroad and Railroad Museum of New England 
 Shore Line Trolley Museum

Delaware
 Wilmington and Western Railroad

Florida 
 Florida Railroad Museum
 Gold Coast Railroad Museum
 Kirby Family Farm Train
 Orlando & Northwestern Railway (Closed in 2020)
 Seminole Gulf Railway
 Serengeti Express in Busch Gardens Tampa
 Sugar Express
 TECO Line Streetcar
 Tavares, Eustis & Gulf Railroad (Closed in 2017)
 Walt Disney World Railroad
 Wildlife Express Train at Disney's Animal Kingdom

Georgia
 Agrirama Logging Train
 Azalea Sprinter
 Blue Ridge Scenic Railway
 Chickamauga Train from Tennessee Valley Railroad Museum
 Georgia Coastal Railway
 River Street Streetcar (Out of service)
 Georgia State Railroad Museum
 SAM Shortline Excursion Train
 Six Flags Over Georgia Park Railroad in Six Flags Over Georgia
 Southeastern Railway Museum
 Stone Mountain Scenic Railroad
 Tallulah Falls Railroad Museum

Hawaii

 Grove Farm Plantation Museum Railroad
 Hawaiian Railway
 Kauai plantation railroad 
 Lahaina Ka'anapali & Pacific Railroad (Closed in 2014, but new operator plans to resume operations at a later date)

Idaho
 Silverwood Theme Park
 Thunder Mountain Line (Closed in 2015)

Illinois
 American Heritage Farm & Railroad
 Fox River Trolley Museum
 Galesburg Railroad Museum (No excursions listed)
 Illinois Railway Museum
 Monticello Railway Museum 
 Silver Creek & Stephenson Railroad

Indiana
 Fort Wayne Railroad Historical Society (For NKP 765 excursion trips, future)
 Hesston Steam Museum (For Hesston and Galena Creek excursions) 
 Hoosier Valley Railroad Museum 
 Indiana Railway Museum
 National New York Central Railroad Museum
 Ohio River Scenic Railway
 Whitewater Valley Railroad

Iowa 
 Boone and Scenic Valley Railroad
 Fourth Street Elevator
 Midwest Central Railroad
 Midwest Electric Railway

Kansas
 Abilene and Smoky Valley Railroad
 Midland Railway

Kentucky
 Big South Fork Scenic Railway
 Bluegrass Railroad and Museum
 Kentucky Railway Museum
 Kentucky Steam Heritage Corporation (For C&O 2716 excursion trips)
 My Old Kentucky Dinner Train (Between Bardstown and Limestone Springs)

Louisiana
 Canal Streetcar Line
 Louisiana Steam Train Association
 Old Hickory Railroad
 Riverfront Streetcar Line
 St. Charles Streetcar Line

Maine
 Belfast & Moosehead Lake Railway
 Boothbay Railway Village
 Downeast Scenic Railroad
 Maine Narrow Gauge Railroad Museum
 Sandy River and Rangeley Lakes Railroad
 Seashore Trolley Museum
 Wiscasset, Waterville and Farmington Railway

Maryland
 B&O Railroad Museum
 Baltimore Streetcar Museum
 National Capital Trolley Museum
 Walkersville Southern Railroad 
 Western Maryland Scenic Railroad

Massachusetts
 Berkshire Scenic Railway Museum 
 Cape Cod Central Railroad
 Edaville Railroad
 Lowell National Historical Park Trolley Line
 MBTA Mattapan Trolley

Michigan
 Coopersville and Marne Railway
 Huckleberry Railroad
 Lake Linden & Torch Lake Railroad (Track is on museum grounds)
 Little River Railroad
 Michigan Transit Museum
 Quincy and Torch Lake Cog Railway
 Southern Michigan Railroad Society
 Steam Railroading Institute
 Weiser Railroad

Minnesota
 Como-Harriet Streetcar Line
 Excelsior Streetcar Line
 Lake Superior and Mississippi Railroad
 Minnesota Transportation Museum
 North Shore Scenic Railroad
 Northfield & Cannon Valley Railroad (Closed in 2007)
 Osceola and St. Croix Valley Railway

Mississippi
 Cleveland Train Museum

Missouri
 Belton, Grandview and Kansas City Railroad 
 Branson Scenic Railway 
 Delmar Loop Trolley
 Frisco Silver Dollar Line in Silver Dollar City
 St. Louis, Iron Mountain and Southern Railway
 Tommy G. Robertson Railroad in Six Flags St. Louis
 Worlds of Fun Park Railroad in Worlds of Fun
 National Museum of Transportation (trolley on grounds)

Montana
 Alder Gulch Shortline Railroad
 Central Montana Rail, Inc.

Nebraska
 Fremont and Elkhorn Valley Railroad (Ended service)
 Nebraska Railroad Museum (In transition to move to permanent home)
 Omaha Zoo Railroad in Henry Doorly Zoo and Aquarium

Nevada
 Nevada Northern Railway
 Nevada State Railroad Museum 
 Nevada Southern Railroad Museum
 Virginia and Truckee Railroad

New Hampshire
 Conway Scenic Railroad
 Hobo Railroad
 Wilton Scenic Railroad
 Winnipesaukee Scenic Railroad 
 Cafe Lafayette Dinner Train
 Mount Washington Cog Railway
 Silver Lake Railroad
 White Mountain Central Railroad

New Jersey
 Black River and Western Railroad 
 Woodstown Central Railroad 
 Cape May Seashore Lines
 Delaware River Rail Excursions 
 New Jersey Museum of Transportation
 Whippany Railway Museum

New Mexico
 Cumbres and Toltec Scenic Railroad
 New Mexico Steam Locomotive and Railroad Historical Society (For AT&SF 2926 excursion trips)
 Sky Railway

New York
 Adirondack Railroad
 Arcade and Attica Railroad
 Buffalo Cattaraugus and Jamestown Scenic Railway
 Catskill Mountain Railroad
 Cooperstown and Charlotte Valley Railroad
 Delaware and Ulster Railroad
 Medina Railroad Museum
 New York Transit Museum
 Railroad Museum of Long Island 
 Saratoga Corinth & Hudson Railway
 Saratoga and North Creek Railway (Closed in April 2018)
 Trolley Museum of New York
 Troy and New England Railway

North Carolina
 Craggy Mountain Line
 Great Smoky Mountains Railroad
 Handy Dandy Railroad
 New Hope Valley Railway 
 North Carolina Transportation Museum
 Tweetsie Railroad

Ohio
 Age of Steam Roundhouse (Several operating steam locomotives, but no excursions listed)
 Cedar Point and Lake Erie Railroad in Cedar Point
 Cuyahoga Valley Scenic Railroad 
 Hocking Valley Scenic Railway
 Kings Island & Miami Valley Railroad in Kings Island
 Lake Shore Railway Association (Lorain and West Virginia Railway)
 Lebanon Mason Monroe Railroad
 Toledo, Lake Erie and Western Railway
 Zanesville and Western Scenic Railroad

Oklahoma
 El Reno Trolley
 Oklahoma Railway Museum

Oregon
 Astoria Riverfront Trolley
 Eagle Cap Excursion Train
 Mount Hood Railroad (Currently in receivership)
 Oregon Coast Scenic Railroad
 Oregon Electric Railway Museum
 Oregon Pacific Railroad
 Oregon Rail Heritage Center
 Santiam Excursion Train
 Sumpter Valley Railway
 Willamette Shore Trolley

Pennsylvania
 Allentown & Auburn Railroad
 Bellefonte Historical Railroad 
 Colebrookdale Railroad
 Dry Gulch Railroad in Hersheypark
 Duquesne Incline
 East Broad Top Railroad
 Everett Railroad
 Horseshoe Curve Incline
 Johnstown Inclined Plane
 Kiski Junction Railroad (Operations suspended 2016)
 Lehigh Gorge Scenic Railway
 Middletown and Hummelstown Railroad
 Monongahela Incline
 New Hope and Ivyland Railroad (New Hope Railroad)
 Northern Central Railway of York
 Oil Creek and Titusville Railroad
 Railroaders Memorial Museum
 Reading Blue Mountain and Northern Railroad
 Reading Railroad Heritage Museum
 Rockhill Trolley Museum
 SEPTA Route 15
 Steamtown National Historic Site
 Stewartstown Railroad
 The Stourbridge Line
 Strasburg Rail Road
 Tioga Central Railroad
 Wanamaker, Kempton and Southern Railroad 
 Wawa and Concordville Railroad (Closed in 1968)
 West Chester Railroad
 Westmoreland Scenic Railroad (Closed in 2004)
 Williams Grove Historical Steam Engine Association

Rhode Island
 Newport and Narragansett Bay Railroad

South Carolina
Rockton, Rion and Western Railroad/South Carolina Railroad Museum/Rockton and Rion Railroad Historic District

South Dakota
 Black Hills Central Railroad
 Prairie Village, Herman and Milwaukee Railroad

Tennessee
 Dollywood Express in Dollywood
 Lookout Mountain Incline Railway
 MATA Trolley (Memphis)
 Southern Appalachia Railway Museum
 Tennessee Central Railway Museum
 Tennessee Valley Railroad Museum
 Three Rivers Rambler

Texas
 Austin Steam Train Association 
 Galveston Island Trolley 
 Grapevine Vintage Railroad
 Jefferson and Cypress Bayou Railway
Longhorn and Western Railroad (Texas Transportation Museum)
 McKinney Avenue Transit Authority 
 Rosenberg Railroad Museum
 Six Flags & Texas Railroad in Six Flags Over Texas
 Six Flags Fiesta Texas Park Railroad in Six Flags Fiesta Texas
 Texas Railroad Museum (Proposed)
 Texas State Railroad

Utah
 Golden Spike National Historic Site (Promontory Summit, Utah)
 Heber Valley Railroad
 Lagoon Wild Kingdom Train

Vermont
 Green Mountain Railroad
 Steamtown, U.S.A. (Moved to Scranton, Pennsylvania as Steamtown National Historic Site)

Virginia
 Busch Gardens Railway in Busch Gardens Williamsburg
 Virginia Scenic Railway (Buckingham Branch)
 James River Rambler (Buckingham Branch)
 Virginia Museum of Transportation (For N&W 611 excursion trips)

Washington
 Anacortes Railway (Now a static display)
 Chehalis–Centralia Railroad (operations suspended as of 2022)
 Chelatchie Prairie Railroad 
 George Benson Waterfront Streetcar Line (Closed in 2005)
 Issaquah Valley Trolley (Closed in 2020)
 Lake Whatcom Railway
 Mount Rainier Railroad and Logging Museum (Reopening in 2024-25)
 Northern Pacific Railway Museum 
 Northwest Railway Museum
 Pend Oreille Valley Railroad (Ended excursion service in 2016)
 Yakima Electric Railway Museum

West Virginia
 Cass Scenic Railroad State Park
 Durbin and Greenbrier Valley Railroad 
 Potomac Eagle Scenic Railroad

Wisconsin
 East Troy Electric Railroad 
 Kenosha Streetcar
 Kettle Moraine Scenic Railway (Closed in October 2001)
 Lumberjack Steam Train
 Mid-Continent Railway Museum
 National Railroad Museum, Ashwaubenon (includes a small rail loop)
 Osceola and St. Croix Valley Railway
 Riverside and Great Northern Railway
 Wisconsin Great Northern Railroad

Wyoming
Evanston Roundhouse
Union Pacific Steam Program (Cheyenne, Wyoming)
Wyoming Transportation Museum

Territories
Puerto Rico
Train of the South

See also

 List of heritage railways
 List of heritage railways in Canada
 Heritage streetcar

References

External links

 
United States
United States railway-related lists